ZUC is a stream cipher included in the Long Term Evolution standards starting in Release 11 for mobile devices. It is named after Zu Chongzhi, the fifth-century Chinese mathematician.

References

Stream ciphers

Further reading